Grenzlandtheater Aachen  is a theater in Aachen, North Rhine-Westphalia, Germany founded by actor Kurt Sieder (1899–1964) in 1950.

Theatres in North Rhine-Westphalia
Aachen